The 4th Squadron was a squadron of the 6th Air Wing of the Japan Air Self-Defense Force based at Komatsu Air Base, in Ishikawa Prefecture, Japan. It was equipped with North American F-86F Sabre aircraft.

History
On February 1, 1957 (the same day as the 5th Squadron) the squadron was formed at Hamamatsu Air Base in Shizuoka Prefecture as part of the 2nd Air Wing. Six months later it transferred to Chitose Air Base in Hokkaido Prefecture. In 1961 it transferred to Komatsu in Ishikawa Prefecture. It was temporarily based at Tsuiki Air Base in Fukuoka Prefecture in 1973.

It was disbanded on June 20, 1975, and was replaced by the 303rd Squadron equipped with the McDonnell Douglas F-4EJ Phantom II. At that time the type of aircraft operated by a Japanese fighter squadron was linked to the type of aircraft operated. Squadrons 1-11 were F-86F squadrons.

Aircraft operated

Fighter aircraft
 North American F-86F Sabre（1957-1975）

See also
 Fighter units of the Japan Air Self-Defense Force

References

Units of the Japan Air Self-Defense Force